Soltanali Rural District is a rural district (dehestan) in the Central District of Gonbad-e Qabus County, Golestan Province, Iran. At the 2006 census, its population was 30,798, in 6,302 families.  The rural district has 26 villages.

References 

Rural Districts of Golestan Province
Gonbad-e Kavus County